Sean Howson (born 25 November 1981) is a footballer, who last played for Sussex County League  side Hurstpierpoint, where he played as a striker. He is a full international for Montserrat.

References

External links

Profile at webteams.co.uk
 http://www.thefinalball.com/player_teams.php?id=461802

1981 births
Living people
Montserratian footballers
Montserrat international footballers
Black British sportspeople

Association football forwards